Dragonkeeper is an upcoming Spanish-Chinese computed-animated fantasy adventure film based on Carole Wilkinson's novel Dragonkeeper.

Plot 
Set in Han Imperial China, the plot follows the adventures of enslaved girl Ping with ancient dragon Long Danzi.

Cast

English-language voice cast 
 Bill Nighy

 Bill Bailey
 Anthony Howell
 Mayalinee Griffiths as Ping

Production 
The project, an adaptation of the first novel of Carole Wilkinson's 6-book-saga, was reported in 2017 as a Spanish-Chinese co-production between China Film Group's China Film Animation alongside Spain's Dragoia Media, Movistar Plus and Atresmedia Cine.

Release 
The film secured theatrical releases in Spain (by A Contracorriente), China (by China Film Group) and Latin America (by Imagem). Viva Kids scooped North American distribution rights to the film, whilst Hulu nabbed streaming rights for the post-theatrical window in the region. It is scheduled to open in Spanish theatres on 11 August 2023.

See also 
 List of Spanish films of 2023

References 

China Film Group Corporation films
Atresmedia Cine films
Upcoming films
Spanish fantasy adventure films
Chinese fantasy adventure films
Films based on Australian novels
Films set in the Han dynasty